The Talaud flying fox or Talaud fruit bat (Acerodon humilis) is a species of bat in the family Pteropodidae. It is endemic to the islands of Salebabu and Karekaleng in the Talaud Archipelago of Indonesia. Its natural habitat is subtropical or tropical swamps.

The first scientific description was by Knud Andersen in an article from 1909.

Conservation
Threats include hunting and habitat loss from logging.

Sources

Acerodon
Mammals of Indonesia
Mammals described in 1909
Taxa named by Knud Andersen
Bats of Southeast Asia
Taxonomy articles created by Polbot